King Tor Halt railway station was located on the 10.5 mile long single track branch railway line in Devon, England, running from  to  with four intermediate stations. It was opened with only a basic wood platform and shelter in connection with the adjacent granite quarry and the associated worker's houses.  Its later traffic was entirely walkers and like Ingra Tor Halt it was retained in an attempt to counter competition from local bus services and encourage tourist traffic.

History
The branch line was authorised in 1878 and opened on 11 August 1883.  was the junction for the line when the halt opened, three other stations had been added to the line in the 1920s,  in 1924,  in 1936. Much of the route followed the course of the old Plymouth and Dartmoor Railway. King Tor Halt was opened almost on the site of the old Royal Oak Sidings.

The freight traffic on the branch line included granite from the rail served quarries of Swelltor and Foggintor which were closed in 1906.

Owned by the Princetown Railway until 1 January 1922, the company then merged with the Great Western Railway (GWR). The line passed to British Railways (Western Region) in 1948 and closed on 3 March 1956. The track was lifted on 6 December 1956.

Much of the old track formation now forms the route of the Dousland to Princetown Railway Track, and only the concrete base of the shelter at the halt remains.

Services

References
Notes

Sources
 Atterbury, P. (2006) Branch Line Britain: A Nostalgic Journey Celebrating a Golden Age. Newton Abbot : David & Charles.
 Butt, R. V. J. (1995). The Directory of Railway Stations: details every public and private passenger station, halt, platform and stopping place, past and present (1st ed.). Sparkford: Patrick Stephens Ltd. . OCLC 60251199.
 Mitchell, David (1994). British Railways Past and Present - Devon. Wadenhoe : Past and Present. .

External links
Princetown Branch 1923–48 (GWR) – The Encyclopaedia of Plymouth History 
Dousland to Princetown Railway Track – footpath and rough cycle track
Photos of the line today

Disused railway stations in Devon
Railway stations in Great Britain opened in 1928
Railway stations in Great Britain closed in 1956
Former Great Western Railway stations